Pravinbhai Jinabhai Rathod is an Indian politician and former Member of legislative assembly from Palitana and belonging to Indian National Congress party. In 2014, he won the Congress primaries for Bhavnagar Lok Sabha constituency by 303 votes. Rathod belongs to the Koli caste of Gujarat, India.

References 

Living people
Koli people
Year of birth missing (living people)
Indian National Congress politicians from Gujarat